Miss Rwanda 2018, the 8th edition of the Miss Rwanda pageant, was held on February 24, 2018 at Camp Kigali Grounds in the province of Kigali.

The winner, Liliane Iradukunda of Western Province succeeded Elsa Iradukunda of Western Province.

Results

Special Awards 
Miss Congeniality - Southern Province -  Liliane Uwase Ndahiro
Miss Photogenic - Western - Liliane Iradukunda
Miss Popular - Southern Province - Anastasie Umutoniwase 
Miss Heritage -  Southern Province - Lydia Dushimimana

Contestants

Judges 
 Miss France 2000, Sonia Rolland
 Rwandan social entrepreneur and writer, Gilbert Rwabigwi.
 Radio presenter, Sandrine Isheja Butera
 Miss Rwanda 2016, Jolly Mutesi 
 Economic analyst, Teddy Kaberuka

References

Miss Rwanda
2018 in Rwanda
2018 beauty pageants